The 1972 Peruvian Segunda División, the second division of Peruvian football (soccer), was played by 11 teams. The tournament winner, Atlético Chalaco was promoted to the 1973 Torneo Descentralizado.

Results

Standings

Relegation playoff

References

External links
  La Saeta y la furia

Peruvian Segunda División seasons
Peruana, 1972
1972 in Peruvian football